Hynynen is a Finnish surname. Notable people with the surname include:

Antti Hynynen (born 1984), Finnish footballer
Jouni Hynynen (born 1970), Finnish musician, author, and television host

Finnish-language surnames